Tegeticula baja is a moth of the family Prodoxidae. It is found in Mexico on the Baja California Peninsula.

The wingspan is 18.3–20 mm for males and 20.5–23 mm for females. The forewings are white with scattered
cinnamon brown scales and a narrow band of brown scales. The hindwings are light brownish grey. Adults are on wing in August.

The larvae feed on Yucca valida and Yucca capensis.

Etymology
The species epithet refers to the Baja California Peninsula of northwestern Mexico, which circumscribes the range of the species.

References

Moths described in 2008
Prodoxidae